Rachel Cooper (born 14 March 1989) is an Australian association football player who last played for Central Coast Mariners in the Australian W-League. She played for Sydney FC during the 2008–09 season of the W-League.

Rachel signed from Sydney FC in the off-season to join the Mariners.

References

1989 births
Living people
Australian women's soccer players
Sydney FC (A-League Women) players
Central Coast Mariners FC (A-League Women) players
A-League Women players
Women's association football goalkeepers